Reclining Figure 1939 (LH 210) is an elmwood sculpture by Henry Moore. It is an abstracted reclining human figure, with looped head, shoulders, and sinuous body and limbs.

Predecessor
The sculpture draws on Moore's small terracotta 1938 Reclining Figure ( long, now lost) which was cast in bronze (LH 185, in an edition of 7+1: seven casts for sale, and one artist's copy).

Description
Moore scaled up the earlier sculpture up to carve in wood, creating a unique work which measures . It is one of six large reclining figures in elmwood carved by Moore between 1935 and 1978.  The wide grain of elm made it a good choice for his larger carvings, and he uses the grain to emphasise different parts of the work.

Sales
Moore sold the wooden sculpture to fellow artist Gordon Onslow Ford for £300, and used the money to buy other half of his house, Hoglands, in Perry Green, Hertfordshire.  The sculpture was acquired by the Detroit Institute of Arts in 1965.

See also
List of sculptures by Henry Moore

Notes

References
 Reclining Figure, 1939, Detroit Institute of Arts
 Room 7: Elm, Henry Moore exhibition at the Tate, 2010
 Reclining Figure 1939, Henry Moore Foundation

External links

1939 sculptures
Wooden sculptures
Sculptures by Henry Moore
Sculptures of the Detroit Institute of Arts